Des Hamilton is a casting director who began casting in 2001 when fellow Glaswegian Lynne Ramsay asked him to help find a non-actress to play the co-lead opposite Samantha Morton in Morvern Callar. He went on to cast the whole film, street casting Kathleen McDermott, who went on to win the BAFTA award for best scripted casting. He is based in London, with offices in Glasgow too.

Filmography

Television credits

Film credits

References

External links 
 
 

Year of birth missing (living people)
Living people
British casting directors